The Metcalfe County Jail, in Edmonton, Kentucky, is a historic jail which was built around 1861.  It was used to hold prisoners until the early 1980s. It was listed on the National Register of Historic Places in 2004.

It is an early Romanesque Revival-style building constructed of limestone blocks by stonemason John Wilson.

References

Jails on the National Register of Historic Places in Kentucky
Romanesque Revival architecture in Kentucky
Government buildings completed in 1861
National Register of Historic Places in Metcalfe County, Kentucky
1861 establishments in Kentucky
County government buildings in Kentucky
Limestone buildings in the United States
Edmonton, Kentucky